Goytre Association Football Club is a football club is based in the village of Penperlleni, Monmouthshire in South Wales. The team play in the Ardal Leagues South East, tier 3 of the Welsh football pyramid.

They play at their Plough Road ground which opened in the mid-1990s. The clubhouse has recently been extended to accommodate a function room and further expansion is planned to include a second playing surface and training ground.

References

External links

Association football clubs established in 1902
Football clubs in Wales
Sport in Monmouthshire
1902 establishments in Wales
Gwent County League clubs
Welsh Football League clubs
Ardal Leagues clubs